American singer Nicole Scherzinger has recorded songs for two studio albums and other projects, including collaborations with other artists. She came to prominence in the early 2000s as a member of the girl-group Eden's Crush. Under her Hawaiian name, Nicole Kea, she began distributing demo CDs to different labels in hopes of a solo deal. In 2003 Scherzinger auditioned for and was cast as the lead singer of The Pussycat Dolls, a burlesque troupe turned recording music group.

While recording the group's debut album, PCD (2005), Scherzinger began working on her own solo album titled Her Name Is Nicole, which was due to be released in 2007. Over the course of two years, Scherzinger recorded around 100 songs while working with songwriter-producers Akon, Sean Garrett, Gary Lightbody, Ne-Yo, Polow da Don, T.I., Timbaland and will.i.am. In September 2007 Scherzinger released her debut single, "Baby Love" featuring will.i.am, achieving moderate success. The lack of success of the other three singles: "Whatever U Like", "Supervillain" and "'Puakenikeni", led Scherzinger to cancel the project and focus on the Pussycat Dolls' second studio album. Doll Domination (2008) included songs like "Happily Never After", "I Hate This Part", "When I Grow Up" and "Who's Gonna Love You" which were originally recorded by Scherzinger for her solo effort. In 2009 Scherzinger was asked to re-write and record a pop music version of "Jai Ho", a song from the film Slumdog Millionaire. The new English language version of the song was called "Jai Ho! (You Are My Destiny), and Scherzinger was credited as a featured artist causing internal strife within and the eventual split of the group.

Following the disbandment of the Pussycat Dolls, Scherzinger once again began working on her debut studio album in 2010. Moroccan producer RedOne, famed for his work with Lady Gaga, worked extensively with Scherzinger, producing and writing half of the album's songs. The album was named Killer Love, after a song of the same name produced by RedOne. Scherzinger would later confirm that it was her decision to not put out the previous incarnation of her debut album, Her Name is Nicole. Killer Love was released on March 11, 2011, featuring just one of the songs from the Her Name is Nicole recording sessions, Scherizinger's collaboration with Sting, "Power's Out". Scherzinger and RedOne wrote the lead single "Poison", "Killer Love", "Desperate" and "Everybody" while "AmenJena" was co-written with Trina Harmon. Other contributions come from the likes of Jim Jonsin, StarGate, Terius "The-Dream" Nash, Christopher "Tricky" Stewart and Boi-1da. The second single, "Don't Hold Your Breath", was written by Josh Alexander, Billy Steinberg and Toby Gad; it reached number one on the UK Singles Chart and became Scherzinger's highest-charting single in the country, while its third single "Right There" became the singer's highest-charting single on the Billboard Hot 100.

In March 2013, Scherzinger released a new will.i.am-produced single "Boomerang", which was expected to be the lead single from her then untitled second album. New recording sessions resumed with previous collaborators Tricky Stewart and The-Dream in the summer of 2013 and by 2014, Scherzinger had left her long time record label Interscope for a new multi-record deal with RCA Records and Sony Music. Second album Big Fat Lie was released in October 2014 and features the singles "Your Love", "Run", "On the Rocks" and "Bang". The album was written and produced almost entirely by Tricky Stewart and The-Dream, with Scherzinger co-writing the title track, and Justin Tranter and Julia Michaels contributing to "Run". During her career, Scherzinger has also covered songs from various musicals, including "And I Am Telling You" (from Dreamgirls) with Sam Bailey, for Bailey's debut album The Power of Love, "Memory" (from Cats) and "Don't Cry for Me Argentina" (from Evita) amongst others.

List of songs

Unreleased songs

See also 
Nicole Scherzinger discography
List of songs recorded by The Pussycat Dolls

Notes 
 "Baby Love" (JR remix) was featured on some released of the international deluxe edition of the Pussycat Dolls's second album Doll Domination.
 "Hasta el Éxtasis" is the Spanglish recording of "Fino all'estasi".
 The Rudi Wells Open Heart remix of "Heartbeat" was featured on Scherzinger's debut album Killer Love.
 Scherzinger is only credited as being featured on "Hush Hush; Hush Hush" in Canada and the United States. 
 "Mona Lisa Smile" is an alternative version of the 2013 song "Smile Mona Lisa", for which Scherzinger has uncredited/additional vocals. The song is taken from will.i.am's 2013 album #willpower.
 Scherzinger has uncredited/additional vocals on "Smile Mona Lisa" by will.i.am, taken from the latter's 2013 album #willpower.

References 

 
Scherzinger, Nicole